Agim Shuka (April 1942 – 20 May 1992) was an Albanian film and stage actor.

Education 
After graduating from the Higher Institute of Arts (today the Academy of Arts), he started working as an actor in the People's Theatre (today the National Theatre) and later as a lecturer at the Higher Institute of Arts (today the Academy of Arts) 

His first film role was "Dini" in Oshtimim në bregdet in 1966. Other film roles would continue, such as the role of "Bashkim" in Old Wounds in 1969; "Sandri" in In the Beginning of Summer in 1975; the role of the Albanian Commissioner of the Naval Base in Face to Face; "Musa" in Militant in 1984, etc. His most recent role was as Anila's father in A Boy and A Girl in 1990. 

Shuke was survived by his wife,  Fedra Shuka, and his two children, Orli Shuka and Iris Shuka, in 1992.

Filmography        
1990—Fletë të bardha .............................Kryetari i Kooperativës

1990—Një djalë edhe një vajzë ...............................Babai i Anilës 

1988—Shkëlqimi i përkohëshëm ...............................Trajneri

1988—Treni niset në shtatë pa pesë ........................Doktori

1987—Telefoni i një mëngjesi ...............................Dhimitri

1986—Dy herë mat............................................Shefi i Policisë

1986—Rrethimi i vogël..............................Faiku, Sekretari i Partisë së Rrethit

1985—Të shoh në sy ...............................Zv/Drejtori

1984—Militanti .................................................Musai

1984—Taulanti kërkon një motër ............................Gëzimi

1982—Shi në plazh teatër-komedi.............................Daja

1982—nëntori i dytë ..........................................Jani Minga

1980—Një ndodhi në port .....................................Inxhinieri i laboratorit

1980—Vëllezër dhe shokë .....................................Dania,nallbani i fshatit

1979—Ballë për ballë .....................................Komisari Shqiptar i Bazës

1979—Përtej mureve të gurta ................................Doktor Xhema

1978—I treti .........................................Gëzimi

1978—Vajzat me kordele të kuqe ............................Mësuesi i Historisë

1975—Në fillim të verës .......................................Sandri

1969—Plagë të vjetra ..........................................Bashkimi

1966—Oshëtim në bregdet ...................................Dini

References  

1942 births
1992 deaths
20th-century Albanian actors